Veth Rathana (born  1986) was a Cambodian actress whose popularity rose in the mid-2000s from 2003 to 2007. She was among the most successful Cambodian actresses of the 2000s alongside Danh Monika, Keo Pich Pisey, Sim Solika, and Suos Sotheara. In 2006, she married Tuk Vandy and in 2007 Rattana fled to The United States of America with her husband. In that same year she left, the Cambodian film industry had a downfall.

Filmography

References

1986 births
Living people
Cambodian film actresses
21st-century Cambodian actresses
People from Phnom Penh